899 Jokaste is a minor planet orbiting the Sun.  It was one of five minor planets included in the 1993 study, Transition Comets -- UV Search for OH Emissions in Asteroids, which was research involving amateur astronomers who were permitted to make use of the Hubble Space Telescope. Not to be confused with Iocaste, a moon of Jupiter.

References

External links
 
 

000899
Discoveries by Max Wolf
Named minor planets
000899
19180803